is a former Japanese football player.

Club career
Kiyono was born in Kanagawa on April 23, 1973. After graduating from high school, he joined Nagoya Grampus Eight in 1992. He debuted in 1992 J.League Cup. In 1992, he moved to German Osnabrück on loan. In 1993, he returned to Grampus Eight. However he could not play at all in the match and retired end of 1995 season.

Club statistics

References

External links

1973 births
Living people
Association football people from Kanagawa Prefecture
Japanese footballers
J1 League players
Nagoya Grampus players
Association football defenders